Hamidreza Nadaf (born November 19, 1992 in Isfahan) is a member of the Iranian national tennis team.

Hamidreza is the only Iranian tennis player who has not recorded any loss in the Davis Cup.

He made his official debut in 2014, ranking 1365 in the ATP and 1835 in the ITF. His highest rankings are 505 and 803 in the ITF and ATP, respectively. He also ranked 1937 in doubles. In the ranking of the Tennis Federation of the Islamic Republic of Iran in 1401, he has been ranked 5th with 1000 points.

Background
Hamidreza Nadaf started playing tennis at the age of 7 and at the same time was active in fields such as football and gymnastics. At the age of 12 he pursued the sport of tennis more seriously and finally at the age of 19 he entered the field professionally and was able to He won the national championship and was ranked in the world championships and was invited to the national team at the same age.

From the age of 14, he was a champion in the national championships, and at the age of 16, after his good growth, he was a finalist in the International Youth Championship (ITF), which is held in Iran like all other parts of the world. It reached the world ranking period and rose to the rank of 413 in the world; He also participated in the world adult competitions and when he was 18 years old, he was able to get 4 factors of these competitions and was also in the world ranking of adults. Since then, he has been a regular member of the national team and was sent to various international competitions and was able to prove his place in the national team. He has a record of 7 consecutive games without a loss.

Honors

Davis Cup

References

Iranian male tennis players
1992 births
Living people